Hadley is an unincorporated community in Marion Township, Hendricks County, Indiana.

History
Hadley was platted in 1872. It was named for the Hadley family of settlers.

Geography

Notable person
 Barzilla W. Clark, 16th Governor of Idaho 1937–1939; born in Hadley.

References

Unincorporated communities in Hendricks County, Indiana
Unincorporated communities in Indiana
Indianapolis metropolitan area
Populated places established in 1872
1872 establishments in Indiana